The radiated shanny (Ulvaria subbifurcata) is a species of marine ray-finned fish belonging to the family Stichaeidae, the pricklebacks and shannies. It is the only species in the monotypic genus Ulvaria. This fish is found in the northwestern Atlantic Ocean.

Taxonomy
The radiated shanny was first formally described in as Pholis subfurcatus in 1839 by the American naturalist and physician David Humphreys Storer. Storer gave its type locality as the “intertidal zone” at Nahant, Massachusetts. In 1896 David Starr Jordan and Barton Warren Evermann placed P. subfurcatus in the monospecific genus Ulvaria. This taxon is placed in the subfamily Stichaeinae within the Stichaeidae.

Description
The radiated shanny has an elongate, rather robust, eel shaped body. The terminal mouth has jaws of the similar length with small teeth. The head is rounded and it has large eyes. The long dorsal fin is confluent with the caudal fin, a membrane connects the two but the long anal fin does not reach the caudal fin. The front. Part of the dorsal fin is marked with a large oval spot. The overall colour is yellowish brown becoming more yellow on the lower body.

Etymology
The radiated shanny’s genus name, Ulvaria, means “of Ulva”, the sea lettuce. Many blennies live among this seaweed and when Jordan and Evermann proposed the genus the Stichaeidae was thought to be closely related to the Blennidae. The specific name  subbifurcata means “somewhat two forked”, an allusion to the middle lateral line splitting into two forks.

Distribution and habitat
The radiated shanny is found in the northwestern Atlantic Ocean along the eastern coast of North America from the Strait of Belle Isle in Newfoundland to southern Massachusetts.

Biology
Radiated shannies with lengths less than  mainly prey on copepods and individuals larger than that preyed largely on nereids while all sizes of fish ate polynoids and amphipods. Spawning takes place during May and sexual maturity is attained at ages between 3 and 5 years. There is no obvious sexual dimorphism but males tend to be larger than similarly aged females. Females spawn once in a season but males are involved in up to four spawning sand guard the resultant egg masses. The eggs hatch after 35-40 days into pelagic larvae, these settle on the substrate by August.

References

Stichaeinae
Fish described in 1839
Taxa named by David Starr Jordan
Taxa named by Barton Warren Evermann
Taxa named by David Humphreys Storer